Slap Her... She's French is a 2002 teen black comedy film directed by Melanie Mayron and starring Piper Perabo and Jane McGregor. In the United States, the film premiered on ABC Family on January 9, 2005, under the title She Gets What She Wants.

Plot
High school student Starla Grady is the popular head cheerleader and pageant queen of the small town of Splendona, Texas, who aspires to be a news anchorwoman. She hosts a French exchange student, an orphan named Genevieve Le Plouff. The seemingly shy and harmless Genevieve is immediately in awe of Starla's beauty and popularity. However, after winning the affections of Starla's parents, friends, and boyfriend Kyle, Genevieve soon begins to take over Starla's life.

When Starla is forced to quit the cheerleading squad after receiving a failing grade in French, Genevieve moves in to take her place, and then the roles are reversed. Soon, Genevieve is the popular head cheerleader, and Starla is the unpopular student. Genevieve also replaces Starla in the Junior News Anchor Competition, and, framed by Genevieve, Starla is arrested for possessing a knife and getting high on mushrooms. She is then bailed out of jail by her younger brother Randolph and her classmate Ed Mitchell. Starla eventually learns that Genevieve was, in fact, a former elementary school classmate named Clarissa Fogelsey, whom Starla had embarrassed so badly that she felt compelled to move to France and has returned in disguise to exact revenge on Starla.

With her charade exposed, Genevieve leaves town in disgrace and Starla reclaims her status in school and town. Although Starla never achieved her goals of winning the college scholarship, she now feels that she is a changed person. She also begins a relationship with Ed after breaking up with Kyle. Meanwhile, Genevieve, posing as Starla, is welcomed by her new adoptive French family upon her arrival in Paris.

Cast
 Jane McGregor as Starla Grady
 Piper Perabo as Genevieve LePlouff
 Trent Ford as Ed Mitchell
 Alexandra Adi as Ashley Lopez
 Nicki Aycox as Tanner Jennings
 Jesse James as Randolph Grady
 Julie White as Bootsie Grady
 Brandon Smith as Arnie Grady
 Matt Czuchry as Kyle Fuller
 Christen Coppen as Doreen Gilmore
 Michael McKean as Monsieur Duke
 Haley Ramm as young Starla Grady (uncredited)
 Ashley Blake as Megan
 Laura Halvorson as Beef Band fiddle player

Production
The film was written by Lamar Damon and Robert Lee King, with a rewrite by Alan Ball.

Melanie Mayron replaced director Evan Dunsky ten days into shooting. It was filmed in Dallas and Fort Worth, Texas, in 1 November 2000 to 15 December 2000.

Reception
On Rotten Tomatoes, Slap Her... She's French has an approval rating of 38%, based on 24 reviews, with an average rating of 4.7/10. On Metacritic, the film has a score of 44 out of 100, based on 4 critics, indicating "mixed or average reviews".

Derek Elley of Variety wrote: "Scripters Robert Lee King and Lamar Damon leave no national cliché or double entendre unturned in this good-looking but relentlessly lowbrow outing which plays like 'Clueless Does South Fork' with a side order of garlic."

References

External links

 
 

2002 films
2002 black comedy films
2000s high school films
2000s teen comedy films
American black comedy films
American films about revenge
American high school films
American teen comedy films
British black comedy films
British films about revenge
British high school films
British teen comedy films
Cheerleading films
Constantin Film films
2000s English-language films
English-language German films
Films directed by Melanie Mayron
Films produced by Beau Flynn
Films scored by David Michael Frank
Films set in Texas
Films shot in Dallas
Films shot in Fort Worth, Texas
German black comedy films
German films about revenge
German high school films
German teen comedy films
2000s American films
2000s British films
2000s German films